

Men's 100 m Breaststroke - Final

Men's 100 m Breaststroke - Semifinals

Men's 100 m Breaststroke - Semifinal 01

Men's 100 m Breaststroke - Semifinal 02

Men's 100 m Breaststroke - Heats

Men's 100 m Breaststroke - Heat 01

Men's 100 m Breaststroke - Heat 02

Men's 100 m Breaststroke - Heat 03

Men's 100 m Breaststroke - Heat 04

Men's 100 m Breaststroke - Heat 05

References

Commonwealth Games
Swimming at the 2006 Commonwealth Games